Walter Lyons Kimmick (May 30, 1897 – July 24, 1989) was an American professional baseball infielder. He played for the St. Louis Cardinals, Cincinnati Reds and Philadelphia Phillies.

Kimmick was born in Turtle Creek, Pennsylvania, and died in Boswell, Pennsylvania.

External links

1897 births
1989 deaths
People from Turtle Creek, Pennsylvania
Baseball players from Pennsylvania
Major League Baseball infielders
St. Louis Cardinals players
Cincinnati Reds players
Philadelphia Phillies players
Waynesboro Red Birds players
Waynesboro Villagers players
Rochester Colts players
Vernon Tigers players
Buffalo Bisons (minor league) players
Nashville Vols players
Seattle Indians players
Waterbury Brasscos players
Mobile Bears players
Bridgeport Bears (baseball) players
Wilkes-Barre Barons (baseball) players